Yevgeny Yuryevich Pechenin (born 14 April 1984 in Perm, Soviet Union) is a Russian cross-country mountain biker. At the 2012 Summer Olympics, he competed in the Men's cross-country at Hadleigh Farm, finishing in 37th place.

External links

References

Russian male cyclists
Cross-country mountain bikers
Olympic cyclists of Russia
Cyclists at the 2012 Summer Olympics
Sportspeople from Perm, Russia
1984 births
Living people